Khilfah is a village in Syria located east of Homs in the Al-Mukharram District, Homs Governorate. According to the Syria Central Bureau of Statistics, Khilfah had a population of 1,068 in the 2004 census.

References

Populated places in al-Mukharram District
Alawite communities in Syria